Toru Utumi is a Japanese wheelchair curler.

Teams

References

External links 

Living people
Japanese male curlers
Japanese wheelchair curlers
Year of birth missing (living people)
Place of birth missing (living people)